The Irondequoit Bay Bridge is a  continuous truss bridge spanning Irondequoit Bay in eastern Monroe County, New York, in the United States. The western approach is just east of NY 104's interchange with NY 590. The bay bridge was built in 1967, has nine spans and handles an average of 67,229 vehicles per day as of 2006.

Views from the bridge are somewhat obstructed by the concrete side barriers, especially for smaller cars.

Construction
Constructed in 1967 - 1969, spans Irondequoit Bay from "Newport Point" on the Irondequoit ( west ) side, to "Inspiration Point" on the Webster ( east ) side of the bay. Some 268 piles, with 20 capped clusters, support the bridge, and it is Monroe County's longest bridge. The cost at that time was $7.5 million for the bridge & $17.5 million for the highway approaches, bringing the project total to around $25 million.

Each section ( truss ) was built on a barge, which was then pulled into position by a tug-boat. After it was positioned, water was pumped into the pontoons of the barge to sink it enough to enable it to be moved from under the truss.

Rehabilitation Project and Structural Issues
Preventive maintenance activity on this bridge is meant to extend the life of the bridge by 12+ years in order to maintain the appropriate maintenance cycle.

The $14 million rehabilitation project, substantially completed 07/01/2013, involved steel and concrete repairs, sandblasting and repainting and replacement of bridge joints. The work necessitated frequent lane closures and, for several weekends in 2012, closure of all the lanes in a given direction while the joint replacements were done.

During the biennial inspection in August (of 2013), a "handful" of the beams were found to be bent downward about a quarter-inch at the outer end — the end that lies at the outer edge of the right-hand lanes. "It's just ever so slight, literally the size of my pencil eraser," Maher said of the deformation. As a result of the discovery, the eastbound and westbound right-hand lanes of the Irondequoit Bay bridge were closed without notice early October 2013 and reopened in March 2014.

References

Continuous truss bridges in the United States
Bridges completed in 1967
Road bridges in New York (state)
Metal bridges in the United States
Bridges in Monroe County, New York